Piotr Dunin (c. 1415 – 1484) was a Polish leader. Starost of Malbork 1478–1484, castellan of Sieradz from 1478, voivode of Brześć Kujawski Voivodeship from 1481.

On 17 September 1462 he led the Polish army to victory over the Teutonic Knights in the Battle of Świecino. This Thirteen Years' War battle brought an end to Teutonic control of the region, as the Knights never recovered from it and those that followed.

References

1415 births
1484 deaths
Polish military leaders
15th-century Polish nobility
Piotr